Station Noord (Dutch: Station Noord) is the northernmost station of the Amsterdam Metro's Route 52 (North–South Line) in Amsterdam, Netherlands. The line and station were opened on 22 July 2018.

Location

 Noord is an overground station situated in the Buikslotermeer neighbourhood of the borough of Amsterdam-Noord (Amsterdam North). It is the northern terminus of the Route 52, which is running on the North-South Line. This metro route provides the northern borough with direct, rapid transit access to Amsterdam Centraal station, the Amsterdam city centre and the southern borough where it terminates at Amsterdam Zuid station.  It is projected that more than 42,500 passengers will be using the station on a daily basis.

Until March 2012, the station was named Buikslotermeerplein after the nearby square. On 7 April 2014, with the placement of the first frame for the station roof, the highest point of the new metro line was reached.

Design

The station, designed by Benthem Crouwel Architects, is situated on a new crossover in the median of the Nieuwe Leeuwarderweg thoroughfare. The station has two entrances and a platform island of about 130 metres long and 13.1 metres wide, in which five open spaces are created. On either side of each open space, the platform is 3.5 metres wide. On the north side of the station, a bus station as well as a train yard are constructed. In May 2013, a municipal advisory committee selected an artwork by Harmen Liemburg to be installed at this station. It is a drawing based on old maps and the various birds that live in and around Amsterdam, which will be carved out in the floor tiles of the platform.

Along with the construction of the metro station, the surrounding area will be revived. Next to the station site is the new Borough Council Office, which was opened in 1999. To the east of the station site is the shopping centre Boven 't IJ, which is renovated and expanded with apartments, sports facilities, a cultural centre, a movie theater, educational facilities and office space. The new streets in the immediate vicinity of the station were named after major train and subway stations in other European capitals: Gare du Nord, King's Cross and Termini.

Services

Buses 
City Buses

These services are operated by GVB.

 30 - Station Noord - Buikslotermeerplein - Olof Palmeplein - Dorpsweg - Holysloot 
 31 - Station Noord - Buikslotermeerdijk - Kerklaan - Zunerdorp
 34 -  Olof Palmeplein - Station Noord - Floradorp - Noorderpark - Meeuwenlaan
 36 - Olof Palmeplein - Station Noord - Molenwijk - Station Sloterdijk
 37 - Station Noord - Niewendam - Muiderpoortstation - Transvaalbuurt - Amstelstation
 38 - Station Noord - Olof Palmeplein - Havikslaan - Buiksloterwegveer - Buiksloterham
 245 - Molenwijk - Station Noord - Niewendam - Muiderpoortstation - Traansvelbuurt - Amstelstation - Schiphol North - Schiphol Center - Schiphol South

Regional Buses

These buses are operated by EBS and Connexxion, as part of the R-net network.

 301 - Buiksloterwegveer - Station Noord - Ilpendam - Purmerend Overwhere - Edam 
 304 - Station Noord - Ilpendam - Purmerend De-Gros Zuid - Purmerend The Purmer West - Purmerend Korenstraat 
 307 - Station Noord - Ilpendam - Purmerend The Purmer East - Purmerend Korenstraat
 308 - Station Noord - Ilpendam - Purmerend Weidevenne
 312 - Station Noord - Broek in Waterland - Monnickendam Bernhard Bridge - Edam
 315 - Station Noord - Broek in Waterland - Monnickendam - Marken
 319 - Station Noord - Landsmeer
 392 - Station Noord - Oostzaan - Zaandam De Vlinder - Zaandam Station

References

External links

GVB website 
North-South Line project site 

Amsterdam Metro stations
Railway stations opened in 2018
2018 establishments in the Netherlands
Railway stations in the Netherlands opened in the 21st century